"Columbus Was a Dope" is a science fiction short story by American writer Robert A. Heinlein.  It was first published in the May 1947 issue of Startling Stories.  It later appeared in two of Heinlein's collections, The Menace from Earth (1959), and Off the Main Sequence: The Other Science Fiction Stories of Robert A. Heinlein (2005).

Plot summary
Two bar patrons and a bartender debate building a generation ship to Proxima Centauri. One favors space exploration as benefiting society like Christopher Columbus's discovery of the New World; the other insists that "Columbus was a dope" and should have stayed home. At the end of the story, it is revealed that the bar is on the Moon.

Release 
"Columbus Was a Dope" was first published in the May 1947 issue of Startling Stories.  It was subsequently released in the anthology collection Travelers of Space in 1951, through Gnome Press.

Reception
William H. Patterson Jr. claimed that "Columbus Was a Dope," along with other stories collected in The Menace from Earth, occurs within Heinlein's World as Myth framework, stating that they "are happening somewhere else in the Multiverse, somewhere quite close by the Future History."

References

External links
 
 "Columbus Was a Dope" at the Internet Archive

Short stories by Robert A. Heinlein
1947 short stories
Works originally published in Startling Stories